Laura Gonçalves (born February 4, 1989) is a Portuguese-Venezuelan model and beauty pageant titleholder. She was crowned Miss Universo Portugal 2011, on July 29 at the Hotel Miragem in Cascais. She represented Portugal at the Miss Universe 2011 pageant and made the Top 10, making it the highest placement for Portugal. She has also won the most fan votes, by this she automatically placed into Top 16 and was the only Portuguese contestant to place in Miss Universe until 2019 when Sylvie Silva placed in the Top 20.

Laura was born in Baruta to Portuguese parents who were born and raised in Caracas. She graduated from Academia Merici, a prestigious Ursuline school in 2007. She returned to Portugal with her parents to start college and pursue a modeling career. She speaks fluent Portuguese, Spanish and English.

Laura attended the New University of Lisbon and lives in Porto.

References

External links
Pageantfanatic.jimdo.com
Missfloridausa.com                                                        

1989 births
Living people
People from Caracas
Venezuelan beauty pageant winners
Venezuelan people of Portuguese descent
Miss Universe 2011 contestants